Zee Live is an IP division of Zee Entertainment Enterprises that aims to create programming for all age groups in India. Currently under its umbrella are 3 productions – Arth – A Culture Fest in culture, Supermoon in music and comic, and Zee Educare in education. Swaroop Banerjee now heads Zee Live.

Divisions

Arth – A Culture Fest
The first season of Arth was held on 1 and 2 December 2018, at P C Chandra Garden, Kolkata and on 8, 9 & 10 December 2018, at IGNCA, New Delhi, and the second season was held on 4 & 5 January 2020, at Swabhumi, Kolkata and 21, 22 and 23 February, at Jawaharlal Nehru Stadium, Delhi.

Supermoon
Supermoon brings entertainment acts from around the world to India.

Zee Educare
Zee Educare is an alternate career festival for students.

Season 1 of the festival took place on 20th and 21st April 2019, and Season 2 on 23rd and 24th November 2019.

Zee Educare also hosts a nation-wide talent hunt titled "Big Break" where the top 5 entries are given an opportunity to perform live at the festival. The winner of the Big Break wins Rs 50,000 and the top 5 are given the opportunity to open for the headliner.

References

External links 
 

Zee Entertainment Enterprises
Mass media companies of India
Entertainment companies of India
1980 establishments in India